Savinkov is a Russian masculine surname, its feminine counterpart is Savinkova. It may refer to

Boris Savinkov (1879–1925), Russian writer and revolutionary militant
Galina Savinkova (born 1953), Soviet discus thrower
Ludmila Savinkova (born 1936), Soviet rhythmic gymnast

Russian-language surnames